Warrane Barracks is an Australian Army barracks in the Hobart suburb of Mornington. It is the home of several units including:

 Former home to B Coy, 12th/40th Battalion Royal Tasmania Regiment, prior to their move to Derwent Barracks in 2018.
 60 Army Cadet Unit, Australian Army Cadets

References

Barracks in Australia
Military installations in Tasmania